Leon G. Lebel (April 10, 1912 – November 24, 1975) was an American politician from Maine. Lebel, a Democrat, served in the Maine House of Representatives from 1959 to 1972. He was a resident of Van Buren, Maine.

References

1912 births
1975 deaths
People from Van Buren, Maine
Democratic Party members of the Maine House of Representatives
20th-century American politicians